Lacassá Soup is a Macanese soup.

History
The soup has its roots in Malacca, and is believed to be an evolution of Laksa soup from Peranakan cuisine. The word Lacassá is noted to be a Macanese term for vermicelli, with roots in Indian languages.

As it contains no meat, Lacassá Soup is traditionally consumed on Christmas Eve, historically a day of abstinence for Catholic faithfuls. Lacassá Soup is also featured in a proper Cha Gordo, a social event that has been likened to high tea, and features multiple dishes.

Ingredients
Lacassá Soup contains vermicelli (hence its name, as explained above), shrimp, and balichão.

References

External links
 

Macanese cuisine
Shrimp dishes
Soups